Antonio Ayala Arias (born 2 February 1947 in Los Reyes de Salgado, Michoacán) is a Mexican former basketball player who competed in the 1968 Summer Olympics and in the 1976 Summer Olympics.

References

1947 births
Living people
Mexican men's basketball players
1967 FIBA World Championship players
1974 FIBA World Championship players
Olympic basketball players of Mexico
Basketball players from Michoacán
Basketball players at the 1968 Summer Olympics
Basketball players at the 1976 Summer Olympics
Basketball players at the 1967 Pan American Games
Pan American Games medalists in basketball
Pan American Games silver medalists for Mexico
Medalists at the 1967 Pan American Games